40 mm grenade (also styled 40mm grenade) is a generic class-name for grenade launcher ammunition (subsonic shells) in  caliber. The generic name stems from the fact that several countries have developed or adopted grenade launchers in 40 mm caliber.

This is a general collection of the world's many different "40 mm grenades".

NATO 
NATO currently uses three standardized 40 mm grenade families: 40 mm low velocity (LV), 40 mm medium velocity (MV), and 40 mm high velocity (HV). Low- and medium-velocity cartridges are used for different hand-held grenade launchers, while the high-velocity cartridge is used for automatic grenade launchers.

40×46 mm LV (40 mm low velocity) 

40×46 mm LV (low velocity) is a NATO-standard high–low grenade launcher cartridge meant for hand-held grenade launchers, such as the M79, M203, Milkor MGL, and Heckler & Koch AG36. 

The propellant has low pressure and gives the projectile an average velocity of  depending on the ammunition type.

40 mm low-velocity ammunition types (NATO) 

Besides combat ammo there also exists crowd control ammunition like sponge grenades.

40 mm low-velocity ammunition types (Sweden) 
Sweden currently operates the M203 grenade launcher (designated  in Sweden) and thus uses the 40 mm low-velocity cartridge. Going against Swedish military tradition, the 40 mm low-velocity cartridge currently lacks a specified indigenous designation in Swedish service. Instead only the projectile types have designations.

Currently these projectile types can be found in Swedish service manuals.

Mockups and inert types also exist for loading exercises and educational purposes.

40 mm low-velocity ammunition types (Romania) 
Romanian arms producer ROMARM has made a version of their 40 mm rifle-mounted grenade launcher AG-40 chambered in 40×46 mm NATO (then designated AG-40PN). Production of Romanian 40 mm low-velocity ammunition is handled by the arms factory , a subsidiary of ROMARM. The projectiles seem to be of Romanian origin based on available information.

SAGM fuze 
The United States Army Armament Research, Development and Engineering Center (ARDEC) began development of a 40 mm smart airburst fuze (proximity fuze) in 2011 to improve the ability of grenade launchers like the M203 and M320 to engage targets in defilade. Called small arms grenade munitions (SAGMs), they double the lethality of the standard M433 grenade round by adding a small "smart" fuze sensor that detonates in the air to hit targets in cover or behind obstacles. The airburst function is similar to the XM25 CDTE, which has an onboard laser system to determine the distance to the target, but SAGMs are considered complementary to the XM25 rather than competing against it, as the XM25 provides low-angle fire while 40 mm launchers fire a lobbing trajectory. Integrated sensors and logic devices scan and filter the environment and then autonomously airburst the fuze without needing to be told to by the firer, thereby not requiring the soldier to carry extra weapon accessories. SAGMs enable soldiers to accurately incapacitate personnel targets in defilade at ranges between 50 and 500 meters. The round is engineered with three firing modes: airburst; point detonation; and self-destruct. A successful demonstration occurred in November 2013. Although the SAGM sensor does not need a laser rangefinder or any pre-fire programming sequence, it does require some skill by the user to aim and fire the round correctly so that it can detect the wall or obstruction to detonate in the air. The SAGM was to undergo evaluation in July 2015 and, if successful, transition into an official Army Program of Record by the end of the year. Not only does the fuze burst over walls, but it can detonate when passing cover like trees, bursting just as it senses and passes the trunk. The sort of sensor SAGMs use to differentiate clutter from triggering obstacles is highly classified, but shows airburst reliability of 76 percent.

40×51 mm MV (40 mm medium velocity) 
40×51 mm MV (medium velocity), also known as 40×51 mm extended range low pressure (ERLP), is a NATO-standard high–low grenade launcher cartridge meant for hand-held grenade launchers. Its purpose is to be an intermediate cartridge between the 40×46 mm low-velocity and 40×53 mm high-velocity cartridges and is thus referred to as 40 mm medium velocity.

The propellant has medium pressure and gives the projectile an average velocity of  depending on the ammunition type. It has a maximum range of 800 meters, exceeding conventional extended range low-velocity variants by up to 375 meters.

The 40×51 mm MV cartridge was designed by Rheinmetall Denel Munitions for the US Special Operations Command (USSOCOM) after a 2008 requirement for enhanced range and lethality from hand-held 40 mm grenades. Rheinmetall answered by developing a new family of 40 mm grenades named 40 mm medium velocity and by 2019 the cartridge was undergoing NATO qualification.

Besides NATO the cartridge has been ordered by the South African National Defence Force (SANDF) as the cartridge for their next generation multiple grenade launcher, the Milkor Y4. SANDF approved acquisition in February 2018 but deliveries could not be finished until the end of 2020 due to the COVID-19 pandemic.

40×53 mm HV (40 mm high velocity)  

40×53 mm HV (high velocity) is a NATO-standard high–low grenade launcher cartridge meant for mounted or crew-served automatic grenade launchers, such as the Mk.19 AGL, Mk 47 Striker, HK GMG, STK 40 AGL, and Daewoo K4. 

The propellant has high pressure and gives the projectile an average velocity of  depending on the ammunition type.

40 mm high-velocity ammunition types (NATO)

40 mm high-velocity ammunition types (Sweden) 
Sweden currently operates the Mk 19 grenade launcher (designated 40 mm granatspruta 92 in Sweden) and thus uses the 40 mm high-velocity cartridge. Going against Swedish military tradition, the 40 mm high-velocity cartridge currently lacks a specified indigenous designation in Swedish service. Instead only the projectile types have designations.

Currently these projectile types can be found in Swedish service manuals.

Mockups and inert types also exist for loading exercises and educational purposes.

Green ammunition 

The MK281 is a new type of 40 mm target practice grenade ammunition that has been accepted for use into the United States Marine Corps and the United States Army. It is "green" because it is non-toxic and non-dud producing (since it is a training round), meaning that there is no unexploded ordnance left to clean up on the range and heavy metals in the fuze do not leak into the ground. The MK281 was introduced into parts of the U.S. Armed Forces because of an executive order mandating that they buy green ammunition. The MK281 is manufactured by an American subsidiary of the Rheinmetall Group.

The United States Army has a requirement for a non-dud producing 40 mm training ammunition in both high- and low-velocity variants. The Army awarded four contracts to three United States companies to test designs. The resulting ammunition will not contain explosive energetics and have day and night visible, infrared, and thermal signatures.

Other

40×47 mm (Poland) 

40×47 mm is a cartridge caliber produced in Poland for their Pallad wz. 74 rifle-mounted grenade launchers (used with the AK family of rifles in the Polish Army, like the AKM/AKMS, Tantal and Beryl) and Pallad-D wz. 83 grenade launcher (standalone variant fitted with standard pistol grip and folding stock from the AKMS assault rifle). The construction is similar to the one used in 40×46 mm grenades, but they are not interchangeable.

40×47 mm (Romania) 

40×47 mm is a cartridge caliber produced in Romania for their AG-40 model 77 and model 80 (today AG-40P) rifle-mounted grenade launchers. It features a casing with a high–low system. The propellant has low pressure and gives the projectile an average velocity of  depending on the ammunition type.

Production was originally handled by the arms factory Uzina Mecanica Filiasi, however production was later moved to the arms factory Uzina Mecanica Tohan Zărnești, today more commonly known as S. Tohan S.A., a subsidiary of ROMARM.

Several types of the Romanian 40×47 mm exist:

 High explosive
 High-explosive fragmentation
 Smoke
 Incendiary
 Tear gas
 Practice, featuring a small flash charge and smoke signal. 
 Inert

Tohan currently (2021) offers a 40×47 mm high explosive type called GETZ (Grenadă Explozivă Tohan Zărnești) and an inert version called GITZ (Grenadă Inertă Tohan Zărnești).

40×74.5 mm (Romania) 
40×74.5 mm is a cartridge caliber produced in Romania for their AGA-40 Model 85 automatic grenade launcher. It features a casing with a high–low system. The propellant has high pressure and gives the projectile an average velocity of  depending on the ammunition type.

Production is handled by the arms factory Uzina Mecanica Plopeni, a subsidiary of ROMARM. 

Three ammunition types are known: 

 A high-explosive grenade producing 150 fragments weighing  each, creating a deadly radius of  upon impact.
 A high-explosive dual-purpose grenade capable of penetrating  of steel armor.
 An inert cartridge for loading exercise.

Caseless ammunition

40 mm VOG-25 (Russia) 

40 mm VOG-25 (Russian Cyrillic: ВОГ-25) (GRAU-Index: 7P17 (Russian Cyrillic: 7П17)) is a unique type of 40 mm grenade designed in the Soviet Union for hand-held grenade launchers, such as the Soviet GP-25 Kostyor and GP-30 Obuvka. Instead of a casing, the VOG-25 is caseless ammunition, featuring its propellant in an expansion chamber at the base of the projectile, functioning more like a mortar round than conventional cased ammunition.

Today it is used primarily by the Russian Armed Forces in weapons such as the GP-34, BG-15 Mukha and RG-6. Several types exist but the most common version is the default VOG-25 high-explosive version. 

40 mm Metal Storm (Australia) 
During its time (1994–2012), Metal Storm Limited in Australia designed several automatic caseless 40 mm grenade launcher systems based on their own caseless ammunition weapon design. Unlike common caseless ammunition and their weapon systems the Metal Storm design lacked a feeding magazine and instead stacked the projectiles in front of each other in the barrel with the propellant in between the projectiles. The system lacked moving parts and the propellant was electronically primed, allowing for rates of fire up to one million rounds per minute.

The 40 mm grenades used in the systems were off the shelf existing warheads converted to function in the design.

See also 
 35 mm grenade
 40×46mmSR Hellhound
 United States 40 mm grenades

Notes

References

External links 

 Milkor Worldwide
 40mm Low-Velocity Grenades
 Defense Review overview of Mk 47  Mod 0 'Striker' 40mm Grenade Machine Gun
 Defense Review overview of Corner Shot 40 personal grenade launcher
 Defense Review overview of Penn Arms PGL65-40 'Fourkiller Tactical Model' 40 mm Multiple Grenade Launcher
 Penn Arms data page for PGL65-40 6-Shot Grenade Launcher
 Defense Review overview of Metal Storm 40mm Weapon System
 Future Weapons: MEI Mercury 40MM Grenade

Grenades
Ammunition
Projectiles
Military cartridges
Paramilitary cartridges
Large-caliber cartridges